The Bezelberg is a 638 m high mountain with an observation plateau near Neustadt in Vogtlandkreis in the German Free State of Saxony. Because only the very top is wooded, it offers a good all-round view of the local area as well as the escarpment of the Ore Mountains that drops away to the northwest towards Steinberg bei Wernesgrün. In GDR times the mountain was used by the military due to its proximity to the border.

Mountains of Saxony
Mountains under 1000 metres